Aminopyridine may refer to any of several chemical compounds:

 2-Aminopyridine
 3-Aminopyridine
 4-Aminopyridine (4-AP), also known as fampridine or dalfampridine